Montecampione is a ski resort in Valcamonica, Lombardy, northern Italy.

Montecampione is the closest ski resort to Milan's Orio al Serio International Airport.

Statistics
Lifts:  11
Lift capacity:  18,000 per hour
Runs: 23 (around 
Bars: 12 including lodges
Height: 
Vertical: 
Stations: 
 - Alpiaz
 - Secondino
 - Plan

The ski hire shops are at 1,200 m and 1,800 m

External links

 Resort Information
 Lift operator
 Resort Guide

Ski areas and resorts in Italy
Province of Brescia